The Landkreis Sprottau was a district of the German state Prussia from 1816 to 1945. It was part of the Prussian Province of Lower Silesia, before 1919 the Prussian Province of Silesia. In 1932 it was merged with Landkreis Sagan. Its present-day successors are Powiat Żagański and Powiat Polkowicki. On 1 January 1945 it included:
3 cities, Primkenau, Sagan and Sprottau.
102 municipalities,
4 Gutsbezirke (forests and the military training area Neuhammer am Queis).

Demographics 
The district had a majority German population, with a small Polish minority.

History

Municipal constitution

Placenames
Names of two communes were renamed in 1936:
Puschkau → Hirtenau (does not exist)
Tschirndorf → Hammerfeld

District heads
Oskar von Bezold (1932–1933)

Representatives in Provincial Parliament of Lower Silesia
Holders of these political positions were called "Landsrat".
 1811–1831: Kaspar von Knobelsdorff
 1831–1857: Alexander Maximilian von Schkopp
 1857–1869: Robert von Reder († 1869)
 1869–1877: Hans Graf von Kanitz-Podangen (1813–1941)
 1877–1890: Günther von Dallwitz (1838–1910)
 1890–1910: Henning von Klitzing
 1910–1919: Wilhelm Freiherr von Kottwitz
 1919: Eichert (Commissar)
 1920–1925: Dietrich
 1925–1932: Hermann Kranold
 1932–1933: Oskar von Bezold
 1933: Pintzke 
 1933–: Hans-Walter Friderici

References

External links
http://www.geschichte-on-demand.de/sprottau.html

Districts of Prussia
Province of Silesia
1816 establishments in Prussia
1932 disestablishments in Germany